Obelisk Mountain is a mountain, about 2,200 m, between Catspaw Glacier and Mount Odin in the Asgard Range of Victoria Land. Given this descriptive name by the Western Journey Party, led by Griffith Taylor, of the British Antarctic Expedition, 1910–13.

References 

Mountains of the Asgard Range
McMurdo Dry Valleys